Buck Benny Rides Again is a 1940 American Western comedy film from Paramount Pictures starring Jack Benny and Ellen Drew. The film featured regulars from Benny's radio show including Eddie 'Rochester' Anderson, Andy Devine, Phil Harris, and Dennis Day. It also included a debut film appearance for radio star Lillian Cornell. The film was directed and produced by Mark Sandrich and produced by Joseph L. Mankiewicz.

Plot
Jack Benny resists the entreaties of bandleader Phil Harris to journey to Nevada, where Phil's sweetheart, Brenda Tracy, is waiting for her divorce, until Jack meets Joan Cameron, one of a trio of singing sisters. Believing that the only real men hail from the West, Joan spurns Jack's advances even though her sisters encourage the courtship.

Realizing that Jack's infatuation presents the bait to lure him West, Phil tells Joan that Jack owns a ranch in Nevada, and when Fred Allen's press agent broadcasts the story, all of New York starts talking about Jack's ranch. To save face, Jack, determined to prove that he is a true son of the West, travels to Nevada. After Joan and her sisters arrive to perform at a nearby plush dude ranch, Jack poses as the owner of Andy Devine's spread. To impress Joan, Jack pays Andy's ranch hands to stage fights with him, but his plot backfires when he mistakes two real outlaws for Andy's patsies.

Meanwhile, Joan overhears Rochester, Jack's butler, discussing Jack's ruse, and hires the outlaws to hold Jack up, but when she learns that Fred Allen's press agent is in town, she warns Jack. When the outlaws hold up the hotel, Jack, believing that the robbery is a fake, rushes to the rescue and, with the help of his pet bear Carmichael, captures the bandits and saves Joan.

Cast
 Jack Benny as himself
 Ellen Drew as Joan Cameron
 Eddie 'Rochester' Anderson as Rochester Van Jones
 Andy Devine as himself
 Phil Harris as himself
 Dennis Day as himself
 Virginia Dale as Virginia
 Lillian Cornell as Peggy
 Theresa Harris as Josephine
 Kay Linaker as Brenda Tracy
 Ward Bond as First Outlaw
 Morris Ankrum as Second Outlaw
 Charles Lane as Charlie Graham
 James Burke as Taxi Driver

Although Mary Livingstone is credited as a performer, she is only heard on the radio, as is Fred Allen.

References

External links
 
 

1940 films
1940 musical comedy films
1940s Western (genre) comedy films
American musical comedy films
American black-and-white films
1940s English-language films
Films scored by Victor Young
Films based on radio series
Films directed by Mark Sandrich
Films set in Nevada
Paramount Pictures films
American Western (genre) comedy films
1940s American films